The Manises UFO incident took place on 11 November 1979, forcing a commercial flight of the Spanish company Transportes Aéreos Españoles, with 109 passengers, to make an emergency landing at the Manises' airport in Valencia, Spain, when they were flying over Ibiza. After the emergency landing, a Spanish Air Force fighter aircraft took off from Los Llanos Base in order to intercept the mysterious object.

It is the most famous UFO sighting in Spain.

Incident Details

A TAE Supercaravelle was the first aircraft involved in the incident. Flight JK-297 had taken off from Salzburg (Austria) with 109 passengers on board, and had made a refuelling stop on the island Mallorca before setting course towards Las Palmas.

Halfway through the flight, at about 23:00h, Pilot Francisco Javier Lerdo de Tejada and his crew noticed a set of red lights that were fast approaching the aircraft. These lights appeared to be on a collision course with the aircraft, alarming the crew. The captain requested information about the inexplicable lights, but neither the military radar of Torrejón de Ardoz (Madrid) nor the flight control center in Barcelona could provide any explanation for this phenomenon.

In order to avoid a possible collision, the captain changed altitude. However, the lights mirrored the new course and stayed about half a kilometer away from the plane. Since the object was violating all elementary safety rules and an evasive maneuver was deemed impossible by the crew, the captain decided on going off-course and made an emergency landing in Manises' airport. This was the first time in history in which a commercial flight was forced to make an emergency landing because of a UFO.

The flight crew reported the lights abandoning the pursuit just before the landing took place. However, three new UFO signals were detected by the radar, each one with an estimated diameter of 200 meters. The objects were seen by several witnesses. One of the UFOs passed very close to the airport runway, and emergency lights were lit by the land crew in case the object happened to be an unregistered flight experiencing difficulties.

Given the lack of answer to all communication attempts, a Mirage F-1 took off from the nearby airbase of Los Llanos (Albacete) to identify the phenomenon. The pilot, Spanish Air Force captain Fernando Cámara, had to increase his speed to mach 1.4 just to be able to get visual contact with what he perceived to be a truncated cone shape displaying a changing bright color, but despite his initial efforts the object quickly disappeared from sight. The pilot was informed of a new radar echo, which indicated that another object might be near Sagunto (Valencia).

When the pilot was close enough, the object accelerated and disappeared again. This time, though, the UFO seemed to respond and the fighter had its avionics scrambled - its electronic flight systems were jammed and the on-board alert system in the F-1 warned Captain Cámara as if he was being locked-on by a continuous wave missile radar. At last, and after a third contact attempt, the UFO finally disappeared, heading for Africa. After an hour and a half of pursuit, and due to fuel shortage, the pilot was forced to return to the base with no results.

Possible Explanations 

The public impact of the incident was such that on September 1980 it reached the Cortes Generales (the Spanish Parliament). The High Chamber representative Enrique Múgica Herzog publicly asked for an official explanation, but a UFO sighting was dismissed and the incident was attributed to a series of freak optical illusions.

The full official report, declassified by the Spanish Air Force on August 1994, states that the Supercaravelle JK-297 pilot Javier Saenz de Tejada, the land crew in Manises' airport and the Air Force Captain Fernando Cámara might have been misled by "flashes emitted from a distant chemical industry complex" (about 100 miles away from Manises) "and some stars and planets". Although this possibility has been much debated and repeatedly rejected by everyone involved, it stands as the only non-UFO-related explanation. 

The on-flight difficulties experienced by the fighter were not mentioned in the public release. The electronic system failure on board the Mirage F-1 could nevertheless be explained by the fact that the United States Sixth Fleet was stationed in the area, and was making use of a powerful electronic warfare equipment while awaiting the outcome of the Iran hostage crisis. The F-1 combat pilot, Fernando Cámara, rejected such a possibility saying that the Sixth Fleet was too far and furthermore his systems got jammed when he tried to block the UFO with an IR missile.

Bibliography

See also
List of reported UFO sightings

External links
Testimony of Fernando Cámara, pilot of the Mirage F-1 
Rational explanation of the phenomena, by the Anomaly Foundation 

1979 in Spain
Accidents and incidents involving the Sud Aviation Caravelle
Alleged UFO-related aviation incidents
Aviation accidents and incidents in 1979
Horta Oest
Valencian culture